Giuseppe Giulio Salati (February 22, 1847 - July 29, 1930) was an Italian lawyer and author. He was a member of the Order of the Crown of Italy.

Early life 

Giuseppe Giuilo Salati was the eldest son of Donato Antonio Salati (1819-1869) of Gioi and Marchessa Giuditta Rachele Cardone (1818-1891) of Prignano Cilento. He had three children with his wife Donna Beatrice Romano (1870-1952). The Giuseppe Salati family lived at 29 Via Giacumbi within the Commune of Gioi in the Italian Province of Salerno.

Career 
Giuseppe Salati was a career lawyer within the Commune of Gioi. One notable case resulted in his authorship of a book In 1895 that examined when additional lists can be entered in testimony as evidence in civil matters.

As an author, Salati wrote L'Antica Gioi as a way to capture the rich history of the Commune of Gioi and its people. The book was originally published in 1911 by La Meridionale, and was the first encyclopedia for the history of Gioi. L'Antica Gioi was republished in 2003 by Edizioni Scientifiche Italiane, and contained forwards by Gioi mayors Andrea Salati and Guglielmo Manna.

See also 
 Gioi
 Cilento
 Province of Salerno

References

External links 
 
  Comune di Gioi official website 
 SOGNA Inc. (Società Organizzata da Gioiesi in Nord-America)
 Library of Congress file for Giuseppe Salati
 Giuseppe Salati on WorldCat

1847 births
1930 deaths
20th-century Italian male writers
20th-century Italian lawyers
People from Salerno